From April 4–5, 2011, a large-scale damaging wind event and tornado outbreak affected the Southern and Eastern parts of the United States. The system produced a large serial derecho windstorm that caused thousands of reports of wind damage and several embedded tornadoes. Power outages were extensive across the area and tree damage was severe. Several people were killed and injured by falling trees and branches as the storm passed through. Damaging tornadoes touched down in Arkansas, Kentucky, and Mississippi. The storm continued into the early hours of the morning causing more wind damage along the East Coast along with a few more tornadoes. It is reportedly one of the most prolific damaging wind events on record. The outbreak was the first in a series of devastating tornado outbreaks in the month of April 2011, which would culminate near the end of the month with the largest tornado outbreak ever recorded.

Meteorological synopsis 
Several storms started to develop in the evening on April 3. Storms in Kansas,  Missouri, Iowa, and Illinois brought severe thunderstorms to the areas. A tornado watch was issued for Iowa and Illinois as the storms rolled through, and later a severe thunderstorm watch for northeastern Illinois and southeastern Wisconsin. However, there were no reported tornadoes. Continuing eastward, the system entered an environment favoring tornadic development. Two tornadoes were reported in Kentucky during the early afternoon, both rated EF2 and resulting in injuries. Near Hopkinsville, a tornado, confirmed by local emergency services, caused significant damage to a manufacturing plant and injured several people. Numerous buildings were reported to be destroyed, trapping residents within debris. Other tornadoes caused damage and injuries in the southern states including Louisiana and Mississippi. In addition to the tornadoes, there was widespread wind damage (over 1,400 severe weather reports were received by the Storm Prediction Center, with the vast majority being damaging winds) as an extremely large squall line/serial derecho, which had begun to form over northern Texas at around 4 am Monday morning, tracked across the southern United States with wind gusts as high as 90 mph (145 km/h) reported across 20 states. Severe wind damage and power outages also occurred in Arkansas, in addition to a few tornadoes. Nine people were killed in this storm, one of the deaths was as a result of an EF2 tornado in Dodge County, Georgia that destroyed mobile homes. The other fatalities were caused by straight line winds. The squall line continued into the early hours of the morning and caused more severe wind damage and some tornadoes along the East Coast, especially in Georgia and the Carolinas. Numerous power outages also took place due to the extensive wind damage. Nearly 100,000 and 147,000 residences lost power in Tennessee and Georgia respectively.

Confirmed tornadoes

April 4 event

April 5 event

Notes

References 

04-04
F2 tornadoes
Derechos in the United States
Tornadoes in Kentucky
Tornadoes in Arkansas
Tornadoes in Louisiana
Tornadoes in Georgia (U.S. state)
Derecho And Tornado Outbreak
Derecho And Tornado Outbreak